Peter Lars Mikael Borglund (born 29 January 1964) is a retired javelin thrower from Sweden, who represented his native country at two consecutive Summer Olympics (1988 and 1992). He is a five-time Swedish champion in the men's javelin event (1987, 1988, 1989, 1990 and 1996). His personal best is 84.76 metres, thrown on August 19, 1989 in Stockholm.

Achievements

References
Profile
IAAF Profile
sports-reference

1964 births
Living people
Swedish male javelin throwers
Athletes (track and field) at the 1988 Summer Olympics
Athletes (track and field) at the 1992 Summer Olympics
Olympic athletes of Sweden